Keenan Smith (born October 31, 1972, in Philadelphia, Pennsylvania) is an American television broadcaster who is a reporter/anchor for the morning and noon newscasts at WXYZ-TV in Detroit, Michigan. Smith joined the network around September 2010 and served as the morning and noon meteorologist until March 2018. WXYZ-TV meteorologist Kevin Jeanes succeeded him with this role in the same time frame. Prior to his employment at WXYZ-TV, he was at WPTV in West Palm Beach, Florida, from 2008 to 2010 and WGN-TV and CLTV in Chicago, Illinois, before that.

At WGN-TV, Smith's primary responsibility was to provide Tribune-owned cable station CLTV with evening weather reports during the work week. As a WGN staff meteorologist, he also appeared on the noon and flagship 9:00 pm newscasts, filling in for chief meteorologist Tom Skilling.

Before joining Channel 9 in 2003, Smith worked for CLTV for three years.

Keenan's first on-air job in television was at WGAL in Lancaster, Pennsylvania.  Keenan also worked for NBC News in New York City, where he worked as an assistant, and later, associate producer for Dateline NBC and NBC's New York News Bureau.  Keenan returned to on-camera work as a reporter/anchor at WZBN (W25AW) in Trenton, New Jersey, reporter and news and weather anchor at WEEK-TV in Peoria, Illinois, and later as a reporter/news anchor in Raleigh, North Carolina.

A graduate of Franklin & Marshall College in Lancaster, Pennsylvania, he later earned a dual master's degree in Domestic Policy and Urban & Regional Planning from Princeton University in Princeton, New Jersey. His meteorological course work is from College of DuPage, Pennsylvania State University, Portland State University, and Oklahoma State University.

Smith is a full member of the American Meteorological Society and National Weather Association. He holds the AMS Seal of Approval. Smith has been nominated for multiple Regional Emmy for Outstanding Achievement in Weathercasting in Chicago and Detroit. Smith took home an Emmy in 2015. He is the winner of an Illinois Associated Press Award for Investigative Reporting, a Michigan Association of Broadcasters Award for Broadcast Excellence - Weathercast and Michigan Associated Press Award for Best Weathercast.

References

External links 
WXYZ-TV bio

American television meteorologists
Franklin & Marshall College alumni
Princeton School of Public and International Affairs alumni
People from Chicago
Television anchors from Chicago
Television personalities from Philadelphia
Living people
1972 births
Journalists from Pennsylvania
Journalists from Illinois